Heliamphora macdonaldae is a species of marsh pitcher plant endemic to Venezuela. It is closely related to H. tatei and was for a long time considered a form or variety of that species. Putative natural hybrids between H. macdonaldae and H. tatei have been recorded in the southern part of Cerro Duida.

References

Further reading

 Gleason, H.A. (May 1931). Botanical results of the Tyler-Duida Expedition. Bulletin of the Torrey Botanical Club 58(5): 277–344. 
 Steyermark, J.A. et al. (18 May 1951). Sarraceniaceae. [pp. 239–242] In: Contributions to the flora of Venezuela. Botanical exploration in Venezuela - 1. Fieldiana: Botany 28(1): 1–242.

macdonaldae
Flora of Venezuela
Plants described in 1931
Flora of the Tepuis